Antispila trypherantis is a moth of the family Heliozelidae. It was described by Edward Meyrick in 1916. It is found in Guyana.

The wingspan is 7 mm. The forewings are dark fuscous, with shining golden-whitish markings. The hindwings dark grey.

References

Moths described in 1916
Heliozelidae